Martin Franz Dibelius (September 14, 1883 – November 11, 1947) was a German academic theologian and New Testament professor at the University of Heidelberg. 

Dibelius was born in Dresden, Germany, in 1883. Along with Rudolf Bultmann he helped define a period in research about the historical Jesus characterized by skepticism toward the possibility of describing Jesus with historical certainty. In this capacity he is often regarded as an early pioneer of New Testament form criticism, a highly analytical review of literary forms within the New Testament. After studying at multiple universities, he eventually ended up as a teacher of New Testament exegesis and criticism at Heidelberg University. He is well known for portraying Jesus' Sermon on the Mount as reflecting ideals that are impossible to live up to in what he considered a fallen world. He died in Heidelberg in 1947.

Select publications
 
 )

References

1883 births
1947 deaths
Writers from Dresden
People from the Kingdom of Saxony
20th-century German Protestant theologians
German biblical scholars
New Testament scholars
Academic staff of Heidelberg University
German male non-fiction writers